Else Agnes Ella Jacobsen (later Baade) (31 May 1911 – 3 April 1965) was a Danish swimmer who competed in the 1928 Summer Olympics and 1932 Summer Olympics.

In the 1928 Olympics, she was fourth in the 200 metre breaststroke event and fourth in her first round heat of the 100 metre backstroke event and did not advance. Four years later, she won a bronze medal in the 200 metre breaststroke event at the 1932 Olympics.

External links
 Else Jacobsen at databaseOlympics.com (archived)

1911 births
1965 deaths
Danish female swimmers
Female breaststroke swimmers
Danish female backstroke swimmers
Olympic swimmers of Denmark
Swimmers at the 1928 Summer Olympics
Swimmers at the 1932 Summer Olympics
Olympic bronze medalists for Denmark
World record setters in swimming
Olympic bronze medalists in swimming
Medalists at the 1932 Summer Olympics